Västra Frölunda IF is a Swedish football club in Gothenburg. The sports club includes the following sections:

 Västra Frölunda IF Bowling, bowling section
 Västra Frölunda IF Handball, handball section

 Frölunda HC, ice hockey